The Constitution of Prussia can refer to the following:

 Constitution of Prussia (1848)
 Constitution of Prussia (1850)
 Constitution of Prussia (1920)

Politics of Prussia